Melparamb (also known as Melparamba) is a town situated in Chemmanad panchayath of Kasaragod district in Kerala State, south India. It is 4 km South of Kasaragod City & 54 km South of Mangalore town. Melparamb is famous for its soccer tournament and as host for lot of events.

The famous tunnel in Kerala Railway called "kalanad" tunnel pass under Melparamb..

Melparamb is a hill and it has geographical area above the sea level.

Some people also refer Melparamb as kalanad or Chandragiri.

Health and education 
Various public and private institutions in the field of education and healthcare helped people of Melparamb to maintain high standard of living compared to adjacent towns and villages.

Hospitals
 Al Shifa Pharmacy
 City Pharmacy and City Clinic (Dr. Rafi Ahmad)
 Clinic run by Dr. Kayinhi
 Kalanad Nursing Home (also known as Dr Sathya Hospital)
 Shifa-Sa-adiya Hospital 
 Kalanad Govt primary Health Center

Educational institutions

Madrassa
Noorul Islam Madrassa Melparamba
Quthubiyyath Madrassa Kattakkal
Kadavath Madrassa

Schools
 GHS Chandragiri Higher Secondary School
 Lulu English Medium School melparmaba
 Melparamba Jama-ath English Medium School
 GLP Kalanad OLD LP School                             
 SAADIYA ENGLISH MEDIUM

Colleges

Places of worship

Masjids
 Muhyuddeen Juma Masjid, Melparamba
 Aboobacker Sidik masjid, Aramanganam 
 Kuvathotty masjid
 Kainoth Masjid
 Oravangara Masjid
 Riyadhali juma masjid, kattakkal
 Quthubiyyah masjid kattakkal
 Masjidun Noor Kadavath
 jaberi masjid makkod
 Payota Masjid (Marhoom Saeed Musliyar Maqam)
 muhyudheen masjid chaliyangod

Temples
 Kizhur Sree Dharma Sastha Kshethram
 Kurumba Temple Chembarika
 Manyangod mahavishnu temple

Clubs and organizations
 Chandragiri Club Melparamb.
 Gymkhana Club Melparamb
 Green star Koovathotty 
 Thamb Melparamb
 King Star Kadangod 
 Paatna Arts and Sports Club
 Green Star Oravangara
 FASC Kadavath
 MSC Makkod
 Valappil Bulls Melparamba
 Youth Friends Chaliyangod
 United Kainoth

Famous Tournament
 NA Trophy NA trophy football history part-1, NA trophy football history part-2
 Moidu Trophy

Festivals
 Kizhur Sree Dharma Sastha Kshethram paatu Mahotsavam.
 Eid is the main festival for people in Melparamb
 Ratheeb is another festival for people in Melparamb.
 Milad is another one festival
 And even more

Politics 
Melparamb comes under Uduma assembly constituency for Kerala State.
Melparamb is part of Kasaragod Lok Sabha constituency after the delimitation of parliament seats in India.
 Melparamb belongs to Chemmanad Grama panchayath

Transportation
 Nearest Railway station is Kalanad, which do have stop for only passengers trains. The major railway station is at Kasaragod.
 Nearest airport is at Mangalore known as Bajpe/Managalore (IXE) international Airport
 Government transport (K S R T C) bus is the only bus transportation covering Melparamb. There is no private Bus
 Different types of taxi's available in Melparamb.

Tourism 
Tourism sites in the area include Chandragiri Fort, one among a chain of forts built by the ruler, situated atop a hill. The fort has views of the convergence of the river and the Arabian Sea. It is also a vantage point to watch the sunset from the ancient Kizhur State Temple at Chandragiri, which celebrates the annual festival called Pattu Utsavam. Chandragiri is situated 4 km from Bekal.

Other sites include the Kalanad Tunnel, Chembirika Beach, and Bekal Fort (the latter 20 minutes in melparamba town).

References 
 www.melparamb.com
 Around Melparamb

External links
 www.melparamb.com

 www.grooverzfc.com

Suburbs of Kasaragod